Parmeniskos group is a conventional term distinguished by Virginia R. Grace (1956) to describe a type of pottery (amphorae) produced in Macedon during the 3rd century BC. The capital of Pella appears to be the center for this group's production. Amphorae of this type were spread over the northern Aegean, Corinth, Troy and the Black Sea.

The group included the following potters:

References
Pella ~ 300–200 BC Epigraphical Database SEG 50:613,1 until 50:614,2
Google Parmeniskos group

Ancient Greek potters
Ancient Macedonian artists
3rd-century BC Macedonians